Quycaq (also, Kuydzhak) is a village in the Jabrayil Rayon of Azerbaijan. It is currently uninhabited.

History 
In 1993, the village was captured by the Armed Forces of Armenia in the First Nagorno-Karabakh War. On 3 October 2020, the village was reportedly re-captured by the Azerbaijani Armed Forces during the fighting in Karabakh.

References 

Populated places in Jabrayil District